Sirens is the fourth album released by the Greek Black metal band Astarte. It was released in 2004.

Track listing

Personnel

Astarte
Tristessa: Vocals, Lead, Acoustic & Bass Guitars
Hybris: Rhythm Guitars
Katharsis: Keyboards
Ivar: Drums, Percussion

Additional Personnel
Nicolas S.T.C. Maiis: Vocals on "Bitterness of Mortatlity (Mecoman)"
Sakis (from Rotting Christ): Vocals on "Oceanus Procellarum (Liquid Tomb)"
Shagrath (from Dimmu Borgir): Vocals on "The Ring (Of Sorrow)"

References

2004 albums
Astarte (band) albums